Tool Muziq is a studio album by American rapper Pastor Troy. It was released on July 3, 2007 via SMC Recordings. Recording sessions took place at Upstairs Studio in Atlanta. Production was handled by DJ Squeeky, Shawty Redd, J. Troy, Drumma Boy, J.P., Lil' Lody, Prophet Posse, Zaytoven and Pastor Troy himself. It features guest appearances from 2 Dolla, Fabo, Gangsta Boo, "Hitman" Sammy Sam and Mr. Mudd. The album peaked at number 91 on the US Billboard 200 albums chart.

Originally, this album was to have been called Saddam Hussein, but due to controversy it was decided to change the title. Pastor Troy said that with this album he was going back to his roots, the old style for which he was known at the beginning of his career.

Track listing

Personnel
Terrence Cash – additional programming, additional producer, engineering, mixing
J. J. Penders – engineering, mixing assistant
Chris Athens – mastering
Micah Troy – executive producer
Monte "Mont Rock" Malone – production coordinator
Shannon McCollum – photography
Will Bronson – A&R

Charts

References

2007 albums
Pastor Troy albums
SMC Recordings albums
Albums produced by Zaytoven
Albums produced by Drumma Boy
Albums produced by Shawty Redd